Smithwick may refer to:

People
Smithwick (surname)

Places
Smithwick, South Dakota, USA
Smithwick, Texas, USA

Other uses
Smithwick's, a brand of Irish beer 
The Smithwick Tribunal, a 21st-century judicial inquiry in Ireland